German submarine U-514 was a Type IXC U-boat of Nazi Germany's Kriegsmarine during World War II. She was laid down by Hamburg Werft as yard number 310 on 29 April 1941, launched on 18 November and commissioned on 24 January 1942 under Kapitänleutnant Hans-Jürgen Auffermann.

The U-boat was assigned to the 4th U-boat Flotilla for training between 24 January and 31 August 1942 and then the 10th flotilla for operations from 1 September until her loss.

Design
German Type IXC submarines were slightly larger than the original Type IXBs. U-514 had a displacement of  when at the surface and  while submerged. She had two shafts and two  propellers.

U-514 was fitted with six  torpedo tubes (four fitted at the bow and two at the stern), 22 torpedoes, one  SK C/32 naval gun, 180 rounds, and a  SK C/30 as well as a  C/30 anti-aircraft gun. The boat had a complement of forty-eight.

Service history

First patrol
U-514s operational career began with a short journey from Kiel in Germany to Kristiansand in Norway over 12 and 13 August 1942. She then almost immediately headed west into the Atlantic via the gap between Iceland and the Faeroe Islands. Her first victim was the British sailing schooner Helen Forsey in mid-ocean. Following this success, she moved toward the northern coast of South America, where she attacked five ships. One of them was the Canadian merchant vessel  on 11 September 1942 off Barbados, firing six torpedoes into Carlisle Bay. These either missed or impacted on the harbour's anti-torpedo netting. After returning fire with her four-inch gun, Cornwallis sustained a strike from one torpedo that had passed through one of at least four damaged portions of the netting around 4:30 PM. The ship was beached, lest she sink in the harbor, repaired and subsequently returned to service. The boat returned to occupied France, docking in Lorient on 9 November after sinking 9,152 GRT of shipping in 87 days at sea.

Second patrol
Her second foray between 9 December 1942 and 12 February 1943, although at 66 days not as long as her first, still accounted for 7,177 GRT of shipping.

Third patrol
On her third patrol, the outbound boat was attacked twice in the same day, 17 April 1943. The first was by a Wellington of 172 Squadron RAF; the second was by a Whitley of 10 Squadron. Both attacks were unsuccessful, as was U-514s patrol.

Fourth patrol
The German submarine departed Lorient on 1 July 1943 but was sunk on the eighth northwest of Cape Finisterre, Spain by rockets fitted to a British B-24 Liberator of 224 Squadron in the Bay of Biscay among a group of Spanish fishing boats on 8 July. This modification, although effective in this case, was not adopted for use by such an aircraft as the Liberator.

Wolfpacks
U-514 took part in six wolfpacks, namely:
 Delphin (5 January – 9 February 1943) 
 Amsel (22 April – 3 May 1943) 
 Specht (27 April – 4 May 1943) 
 Fink (4 – 6 May 1943) 
 Elbe (7 – 10 May 1943) 
 Elbe 1 (10 – 14 May 1943)

Summary of raiding history

References

Bibliography

External links

World War II submarines of Germany
U-boats commissioned in 1941
U-boats sunk in 1943
U-boats sunk by depth charges
German Type IX submarines
1941 ships
Ships built in Hamburg
U-boats sunk by British aircraft
Ships lost with all hands
Maritime incidents in July 1943
Military history of Barbados during World War II